The 2001 season of the Toppserien, the highest women's football (soccer) league in Norway, began on 21 April 2001 and ended on 27 October 2001.

18 games were played with 3 points given for wins and 1 for draws. Number nine and ten were relegated, while the two top teams from the First Division were promoted.

Trondheims-Ørn won the league.

League table

Top goalscorers
 31 goals:
  Ragnhild Gulbrandsen, Trondheims/Ørn
 19 goals:
  Elene Moseby, Team Strømmen
 18 goals:
  Solveig Gulbrandsen, Kolbotn
 15 goals:
  Ingunn Sørum, Liungen
 14 goals:
  Brit Sandaune, Trondheims-Ørn
 13 goals:
  Ellinor Grønfur, Klepp
  Linda Ørmen, Kolbotn
 11 goals:
  Bente Musland, Arna-Bjørnar
  Kjersti Thun, Asker
 10 goals:
  Kristin Stundal, Asker
  Trine Rønning, Trondheims-Ørn
  Heidi Pedersen, Trondheims-Ørn
 9 goals:
  Ingrid Camilla Fosse Sæthre, Arna-Bjørnar
  Marit Jordanger, Trondheims-Ørn

Promotion and relegation
 Liungen and Athene Moss were relegated to the First Division.
 Sandviken and Larvik were promoted from the First Division.

References
League table
Fixtures
Goalscorers

Toppserien seasons
Top level Norwegian women's football league seasons
1
Nor
Nor